Three Little Wolves can refer to:

 Three Little Wolves (film), a 1936 Disney animated cartoon
  The Three Little Wolves and the Big Bad Pig, a 1993 picture book